Actin binding LIM protein 1, also known as ABLIM1, is a protein which in humans is encoded by the ABLIM1 gene.

Function 

This gene encodes a cytoskeletal LIM protein that binds to actin filaments via a domain that is homologous to erythrocyte dematin. LIM domains, found in over 60 proteins, play key roles in the regulation of developmental pathways. LIM domains also function as protein-binding interfaces, mediating specific protein-protein interactions. The protein encoded by this gene could mediate such interactions between actin filaments and cytoplasmic targets. Alternatively spliced transcript variants encoding different isoforms have been identified.

Interactions 

ABLIM1 has been shown to interact with LDOC1.

References

External links

Further reading